Lists of Indigenous Australians by occupation and/or historical contribution:

 List of Indigenous Australian historical figures
 List of Indigenous Australian musicians
 List of Indigenous Australian performing artists
 List of Indigenous Australians in politics and public service, education, law and humanities
 List of Indigenous Australian sportspeople
 List of VFL/AFL and AFL Women's players of Indigenous Australian descent
 List of Indigenous Australian visual artists
 List of Indigenous Australian writers

See also
 Lists of Australians

Indigenous Australians
 
Indigenous
Lists of black people